Leon Gordon (1830–1892, Judah Leib Gordon) was a Hebrew poet.

Leon Gordon may also refer to:

Leon Gordon (athlete) (born 1974), Jamaican sprinter
Leon Gordon (painter) (1889–1943), American portrait and landscape painter
Leon Gordon (playwright) (1894–1960), English playwright